Jim Butterworth is a technology entrepreneur, documentary filmmaker, and former investment banker and venture capitalist. He is the president and founder of Naked Edge Films, which has produced more than two dozen documentaries that have won an Oscar, two Alfred I. duPont Silver Batons, a Peabody, and have been nominated for four Emmys.  He also is the co-founder of the nonprofit documentary production company Incite Productions, and a director and producer of the award-winning film Seoul Train.  He is also the inventor of 53 U.S. and foreign patents in the field of streaming media.

In 2007, he was awarded the Dartmouth College Martin Luther King Jr. Social Justice Award.  In 2008, he was inducted into the Georgia Tech College of Engineering Academy of Distinguished Engineering Alumni.  He formerly served on the Georgia Tech Advisory Board and is a Member Emeritus of the Georgia Tech ISyE Advisory Board.

Early life and education 
Butterworth graduated from Leon High School, the Georgia Institute of Technology with a bachelor's degree in Industrial and Systems Engineering, and from the Tuck School of Business at Dartmouth College with a Masters of Business Administration.

Butterworth is an Eagle Scout.

Career

References

External links 
 
 Naked Edge Films

American documentary filmmakers
People from Tallahassee, Florida
Georgia Tech alumni
Tuck School of Business alumni
Year of birth missing (living people)
Living people
Place of birth missing (living people)